Terminologia Anatomica is the international standard for human anatomical terminology. It is developed by the Federative International Programme on Anatomical Terminology, a program of the International Federation of Associations of Anatomists (IFAA). The second edition was released in 2019 and approved and adopted by the IFAA General Assembly in 2020. Terminologia Anatomica supersedes the previous standard, Nomina Anatomica. It contains terminology for about 7500 human anatomical structures.

Categories of anatomical structures 
Terminologia Anatomica is divided into 16 chapters grouped into five parts. The official terms are in Latin. Although equivalent English-language terms are provided, as shown below, only the official Latin terms are used as the basis for creating lists of equivalent terms in other languages.

Part I

Chapter 1: General anatomy
 General terms
 Reference planes
 Reference lines
 Human body positions
 Movements
 Parts of human body
 Regions of human body

Part II: Musculoskeletal systems

Chapter 2: Bones
 Axial skeleton
 Appendicular skeleton
 Bones
 Cranium
 Extracranial bones of head
 Auditory ossicles
 Teeth
 Nasal cartilages
 Cartilages of ear
 Laryngeal cartilages
 Vertebral column
 Thoracic skeleton
 Bones of upper limb
 Bony pelvis
 Bones of lower limb
 Joints

Chapter 3: Joints
 Joints of skull
 Joints of auditory ossicles
 Laryngeal joints
 Joints of vertebral column
 Thoracic joints
 Joints of upper limb
 Joints of lower limb

Chapter 4: Muscular system
 Cranial part of muscular system
 Cervical part of muscular system
 Dorsal part of muscular system
 Thoracic part of muscular system
 Abdominal part of muscular system
 Pelvic part of muscular system
 Muscular system of upper limb
 Muscular system of lower limb

Part III: Visceral systems

Chapter 5: Digestive system
 Mouth
 Fauces
 Pharynx
 Digestive canal
 Liver
 Gallbladder
 Extrahepatic bile ducts
 Pancreas

Chapter 6: Respiratory system 
 Nose
 Paranasal sinuses
 Larynx
 Tracheobronchial tree
 Lungs

Chapter 7: Thoracic cavity
 Pleural cavity
 Mediastinum

Chapter 8: Urinary system
 Kidney
 Ureter
 Urinary bladder
 Urethra

Chapter 9: Genital systems 
 Female genital system
 Male genital system

Chapter 10: Abdominopelvic cavity

Part IV: Integrating systems I

Chapter 11: Endocrine glands
 Hypophysis
 Pineal gland
 Thyroid gland
 Parathyroid glands
 Suprarenal gland
 Paraganglia

Chapter 12: Cardiovascular system
 Blood
 Lymph
 Vessels
 Vascular plexuses
 Heart
 Pulmonary vessels
 Cardiac vessels
 Systemic arteries
 Systemic veins
 Great lymphatic vessels

Chapter 13: Lymphoid organs
 Primary lymphoid organs
 Secondary lymphoid organs

Part V: Integrating systems II

Chapter 14: Nervous system
 Central nervous system
 Peripheral nervous system
 Autonomic division of peripheral nervous system

Chapter 15: Sense organs
 Olfactory organ
 Eye
 Ear
 Gustatory organ

Chapter 16: The integument
 Skin
 Skin appendages
 Subcutaneous tissue
 Breast
 Scalp

See also
 Terminologia Embryologica
 Terminologia Histologica
 Terminologia Neuroanatomica
 Foundational Model of Anatomy
 Anatomical terminology

References

External links

 Terminologia Anatomica
 Terminologia Anatomica, Second Edition, International Anatomical Terminology
 TA2Viewer, a searchable, dynamic web application of TA2 (2019)

Human anatomy
Anatomical terminology